Ismail I (July 17, 1487 – May 23, 1524), also known as Shah Ismail, was the founder of the Safavid dynasty of Iran, ruling as its King of Kings (Shahanshah) from 1501 to 1524. His reign is often considered the beginning of modern Iranian history, as well as one of the gunpowder empires.

The rule of Ismail I is one of the most vital in the history of Iran. Before his accession in 1501, Iran, since its conquest by the Arabs eight-and-a-half centuries earlier, had not existed as a unified country under native Iranian rule, but had been controlled by a series of Arab caliphs, Turkic sultans, and Mongol khans. Although many Iranian dynasties rose to power amidst this whole period, it was only under the Buyids that a vast part of Iran properly returned to Iranian rule (945–1055).

The dynasty founded by Ismail I would rule for over two centuries, being one of the greatest Iranian empires and at its height being amongst the most powerful empires of its time, ruling all of present-day Iran, Azerbaijan Republic, Armenia, most of Georgia, the North Caucasus, Iraq, Kuwait, and Afghanistan, as well as parts of modern-day Syria, Turkey, Pakistan, Uzbekistan, and Turkmenistan. It also reasserted the Iranian identity in large parts of Greater Iran. The legacy of the Safavid Empire was also the revival of Iran as an economic stronghold between East and West, the establishment of an efficient state and bureaucracy based upon "checks and balances", its architectural innovations, and patronage for fine arts.

One of his first actions was the proclamation of the Twelver denomination of Shia Islam as the official religion of his newly-founded Persian Empire, marking one of the most important turning points in the history of Islam, which had major consequences for the ensuing history of Iran. He caused sectarian tensions in the Middle East when he destroyed the tombs of the Abbasid caliphs, the Sunni Imam Abu Hanifa an-Nu'man, and the Sufi Muslim ascetic Abdul Qadir Gilani in 1508. Furthermore, this drastic act also gave him a political benefit of separating the growing Safavid Empire from its Sunni neighbors—the Ottoman Empire to the west and the Uzbek Confederation to the east. However, it brought into the Iranian body politic the implied inevitability of consequent conflict between the Shah, the design of a "secular" state, and the religious leaders, who saw all secular states as unlawful and whose absolute ambition was a theocratic state.

Ismail I was also a prolific poet who under the pen name Khaṭāʾī contributed greatly to the literary development of the Azerbaijani language. He also contributed to Persian literature, though few of his Persian writings survive.

Origins 

Ismail I was born to Martha and Shaykh Haydar on July 17, 1487, in Ardabil. His father, Haydar, was the sheikh of the Safavid tariqa (Sufi order) and a direct descendant of its Kurdish founder, Safi-ad-din Ardabili (1252–1334). Ismail was the last in this line of hereditary Grand Masters of the order, prior to his ascent to a ruling dynasty.

His mother Martha, better known as Halima Begum, was the daughter of Uzun Hasan, the ruler of the Turkoman Aq Qoyunlu dynasty, by his Pontic Greek wife Theodora Megale Komnene, better known as Despina Khatun. Despina Khatun was the daughter of Emperor John IV of Trebizond. She had married Uzun Hassan in a deal to protect the Empire of Trebizond from the Ottoman Turks. Ismail was a great-great-grandson of Emperor Alexios IV of Trebizond and King Alexander I of Georgia. 

Ismail grew up bilingual, speaking Persian and Azerbaijani. His ancestry was mixed, from various ethnic groups such as Georgians, Greeks, Kurds and Turkomans; the majority of scholars agree that his empire was an Iranian one.

In 700/1301, Safi al-Din assumed the leadership of the Zahediyeh, a significant Sufi order in Gilan, from his spiritual master and father-in-law Zahed Gilani. The order was later known as the Safavid. One genealogy claimed that Sheikh Safi (the founder of the order and Ismael's ancestor) was a lineal descendant of Ali. Ismail also proclaimed himself the Mahdi and a reincarnation of Ali.

Life

In 1488, the father of Ismail was killed in a battle at Tabasaran against the forces of the Shirvanshah Farrukh Yassar and his overlord, the Aq Qoyunlu, a Turkic tribal federation which controlled most of Iran. In 1494, the Aq Qoyunlu captured Ardabil, killing Ali Mirza Safavi, the eldest son of Haydar, and forcing the 7-year-old Ismail to go into hiding in Gilan, where under the Kar-Kiya ruler Soltan-Ali Mirza, he received education under the guidance of scholars.

When Ismail reached the age of 12, he came out of hiding and returned to what is now Iranian Azerbaijan along with his followers. Ismail's rise to power was made possible by the Turkoman tribes of Anatolia and Azerbaijan, who formed the most important part of the Qizilbash movement.

Reign

Conquest of Iran and its surroundings
In the summer of 1500, Ismail rallied about 7,000 Qizilbash troops at Erzincan, including members of the Ustajlu, Rumlu, Takkalu, Dhu'l-Qadar, Afshar, Qajar, and Varsaq. Qizilbash forces passed over the Kura River in December 1500, and marched towards the Shirvanshah's state. They defeated the forces of the Shirvanshah Farrukh Yassar near Cabanı (present-day Shamakhi Rayon, Azerbaijan Republic) or at Gulistan (present-day Gülüstan, Goranboy, Nagorno-Karabakh), and subsequently went on to conquer Baku. Thus, Shirvan and its dependencies (up to southern Dagestan in the north) were now Ismail's. The Shirvanshah line nevertheless continued to rule Shirvan under Safavid suzerainty for some more years, until 1538, when, during the reign of Ismail's son, Tahmasp I (r. 1524–1576), from then on it came to be ruled by a Safavid governor. After the conquest, Ismail had Alexander I of Kakheti send his son Demetre to Shirvan to negotiate a peace agreement.

The successful conquest had alarmed the ruler of the Aq Qoyunlu, Alvand, who subsequently proceeded north from Tabriz, and crossed the Aras River in order to challenge the Safavid forces, and both sides met at the battle of Sharur in which Ismail's army came out victorious despite being outnumbered by four to one. Shortly before his attack on Shirvan, Ismail had made the Georgian kings Constantine II and Alexander I of respectively the kingdoms of Kartli and Kakheti, attack the Ottoman possessions near Tabriz, on the promise that he would cancel the tribute that Constantine was forced to pay to the Aq Qoyunlu once Tabriz was captured. After eventually conquering Tabriz and Nakhchivan, Ismail broke the promise he had made to Constantine II, and made both the kingdoms of Kartli as well as Kakheti his vassals.

In July 1501, Ismail was enthroned as Shah of Iran choosing Tabriz as his capital. He appointed his former guardian and mentor Husayn Beg Shamlu as the vakil (vicegerent) of the empire and the commander-in-chief (amir al-umara) of the Qizilbash army. His army was composed of tribal units, the majority of which were Turkmen from Anatolia and Syria with the remainder Kurds and Čaḡatāy. He also appointed a former Iranian vizier of the Aq Qoyunlu, named Amir Zakariya, as his vizier. After proclaiming himself Shah, Ismail also proclaimed Twelver Shi'ism to be the official and compulsory religion of Iran. He enforced this new standard by the sword, dissolving Sunni Brotherhoods and executing anyone who refused to comply to the newly implemented Shi'ism 

Qāsim Beg Ḥayātī Tabrīzī (fl. 961/1554), a poet and bureaucrat of early Safavid era, states that he had heard from several witnesses that Shah Ismail's enthronement took place in Tabriz immediately after the battle of Sharur on 1 Jumada al-Thani 907 / 22 December 1501, making Ḥayātī's book entitled Tārīkh (1554) the only known narrative source to give the exact date of Shah Ismail's ascent to the throne.

After defeating an Aq Qoyunlu army in 1502, Ismail took the title of "Shah of Iran". In the same year he gained possession of Erzincan and Erzurum, while a year later, in 1503, he conquered Eraq-e Ajam and Fars; one year later he conquered Mazandaran, Gorgan, and Yazd. In 1507, he conquered Diyarbakır. During the same year, Ismail appointed the Iranian Amir Najm al-Din Mas'ud Gilani as the new vakil. This was because Ismail had begun favoring the Iranians more than the Qizilbash, who, although they had played a crucial role in Ismail's campaigns, possessed too much power and were no longer considered trustworthy.

One year later, Ismail forced the rulers of Khuzestan, Lorestan, and Kurdistan to become his vassals. The same year, Ismail and Husayn Beg Shamlu seized Baghdad, putting an end to the Aq Qoyunlu. Ismail then began destroying Sunni sites in Baghdad, including tombs of Abbasid Caliphs and tombs of Imam Abū Ḥanīfah and Abdul Qadir Gilani.

By 1510, he had conquered the whole of Iran (including Shirvan), southern Dagestan (with its important city of Derbent), Mesopotamia, Armenia, Khorasan, and Eastern Anatolia, and had made the Georgian kingdoms of Kartli and Kakheti his vassals. In the same year, Husayn Beg Shamlu lost his office as commander-in-chief in favor of a man of humble origins, Mohammad Beg Ustajlu. Ismail also appointed Najm-e Sani as the new vakil of the empire due to the death of Mas'ud Gilani.

Ismail I moved against the Uzbeks. In the battle near the city of Merv, some 17,000 Qizilbash warriors ambushed and defeated an Uzbek force numbering 28,000. The Uzbek ruler, Muhammad Shaybani, was caught and killed trying to escape the battle, and the shah had his skull made into a jewelled drinking goblet. In 1512, Najm-e Sani was killed during a clash with the Uzbeks, which made Ismail appoint Abd al-Baqi Yazdi as the new vakil of the empire.

War against the Ottomans

The active recruitment of support for the Safavid cause among the Turcoman tribes of Eastern Anatolia, among tribesmen who were Ottoman subjects, had inevitably placed the neighbouring Ottoman empire and the Safavid state on a collision course. As the Encyclopaedia Iranica states, "As orthodox or Sunni Muslims, the Ottomans had reason to view with alarm the progress of Shīʿī ideas in the territories under their control, but there was also a grave political danger that the Ṣafawīya, if allowed to extend its influence still further, might bring about the transfer of large areas in Asia Minor from Ottoman to Persian allegiance". By the early 1510s, Ismail's rapidly expansionist policies had made the Safavid border in Asia Minor shift even further west. In 1511, there was a widespread pro-Safavid rebellion in southern Anatolia by the Takkalu Qizilbash tribe, known as the Şahkulu Rebellion, and an Ottoman army that was sent in order to put down the rebellion down was defeated. A large-scale incursion into Eastern Anatolia by Safavid ghazis under Nūr-ʿAlī Ḵalīfa coincided with the accession of Sultan Selim I in 1512 to the Ottoman throne, and became the casus belli which led to Selim's decision to invade Safavid Iran two years later. Selim and Ismail had been exchanging a series of belligerent letters prior to the attack. While the Safavid forces were at Chaldiran and planning on how to confront the Ottomans, Mohammad Khan Ustajlu, who served as the governor of Diyarbakır, and Nur-Ali Khalifa, a commander who knew how the Ottomans fought, proposed that they should attack as quickly as possible. This proposal was rejected by the powerful Qizilbash officer Durmish Khan Shamlu, who rudely said that Mohammad Khan Ustajlu was only interested in the province which he governed. The proposal was rejected by Ismail himself, who said; "I am not a caravan-thief; whatever is decreed by God, will occur."

Selim I eventually defeated Ismail at the battle of Chaldiran in 1514. Ismail's army was more mobile and his soldiers were better prepared, but the Ottomans prevailed due in large part to their efficient modern army, and possession of artillery, black powder and muskets. Ismail was wounded and almost captured in battle. Selim entered the Iranian capital of Tabriz in triumph on September 5, but did not linger. A mutiny among his troops, fearing a counterattack and entrapment by fresh Safavid forces called in from the interior, forced the triumphant Ottomans to withdraw prematurely. This allowed Ismail to recover. Among the booty from Tabriz was Ismail's favorite wife, for whose release the Sultan demanded huge concessions, which were refused. Despite his defeat at the Battle of Chaldiran, Ismail quickly recovered most of his kingdom, from east of the Lake Van to the Persian Gulf. However, the Ottomans managed to annex for the first time Eastern Anatolia and parts of Mesopotamia, as well as briefly northwestern Iran.

The Venetian ambassador Caterino Zeno describes the events as follows:

He also adds that:

Late reign and death

Shah Ismail's death ensued after a few years of a very saddening and depressing period of his life. After the Battle of Chaldiran, Ismail lost his supernatural air and the aura of invincibility, gradually falling into heavy drinking of alcohol. He retired to his palace, never again participated in a military campaign, and withdrew from active participation in the affairs of the state. He left these to his vizier, Mirza Shah Husayn, who became his close friend and drinking companion. This allowed Mirza Shah Husayn to gain influence over Ismail and expand his authority. Mirza Shah Husayn was assassinated in 1523 by a group of Qizilbash officers, after which Ismail appointed Zakariya's son Jalal al-Din Mohammad Tabrizi as his new vizier. Ismail died on 23 May 1524 at the relatively early age of 36. He was buried in Ardabil, and was succeeded by his son Tahmasp I.

The consequences of the defeat at Chaldiran were also psychological for Ismail: His relationships with his Qizilbash followers were fundamentally altered. The tribal rivalries between the Qizilbash, which temporarily ceased before the defeat at Chaldiran, resurfaced in intense form immediately after the death of Ismail, and led to ten years of civil war (930–40/1524–33) until Shah Tahmasp regained control of the affairs of the state. The Safavids later briefly lost Balkh and Kandahar to the Mughals, and nearly lost Herat to the Uzbeks.

During Ismail's reign, mainly in the late 1510s, the first steps for the Habsburg–Persian alliance were set as well, with Charles V and Ludwig II of Hungary being in contact with a view to combining against the common Ottoman Turkish enemy.

Royal ideology 

From an early age, Ismail was acquainted with the Iranian cultural legacy. When he reached Lahijan in 1494, he gifted Mirza Ali Karkiya a copy of the medieval Persian epic Shahnameh (Book of Kings) with over 300 illustrations. Owing to his fondness of Iranian national legends, Ismail named three of his four sons after mythological shahs and heroes of the Shahnameh; his oldest son was named Tahmasp, after the last shah of the Pishdadian dynasty; his third son Sam after the champion of the Pishdadian shah Manuchehr and ancestor of the celebrated warrior-hero Rostam; his youngest son Bahram after the Sasanian shah Bahram V, famous for his romantic life and hunting feats. Ismail's expertise in Persian poetic tales such as the Shahnameh, helped him to represent himself as the heir to the Iranian model of kingship. According to the modern historian Abbas Amanat, Ismail was motivated to visualize himself as a shah of the Shahnameh, possibly Kaykhosrow, the archetype of a great Iranian king, and the person who overcame the Turanian king Afrasiyab, the nemesis of Iran. From an Iranian perspective, Afrasiyab's kingdom of Turan was commonly identified with the land of the Turks, in particular with the Uzbek Khanate of Bukhara in Central Asia. After Ismail defeated the Uzbeks, his victory was portrayed in Safavid records as a victory over the mythological Turanians. However, this fondness of Iranian legends was not only restricted to that of Ismail and Safavid Iran; Both Muhammad Shaybani, Selim I, and later Babur and his Mughal progeny, all associated themselves with these legends. Regardless of its increasing differences, Western, Central, and South Asia all followed a common Persianate model of culture and kingship.

Before his defeat at Chaldiran in 1514, Ismail not only identified himself as the reincarnation of Alid figures such as Ali and Husayn, but also as the personification of the divine light of investiture (farr) that had radiated in the ancient Iranian shahs Darius, Khosrow I Anushirvan, Shapur I, since the era of the Achaemenids and Sasanians. This was a typical Safavid combination of Islamic and pre-Islamic Iranian motifs. The Safavids also included and promoted Turkic and Mongol aspects from the Central Asian steppe, such as giving high-ranking positions to Turkic leaders, and utilizing Turkic tribal clans for their aspirations in war. They likewise included Turco-Mongolian titles such as khan and bahadur to their growing collection of titles. The cultural aspects of the Safavids soon became even more numerous, as Ismail and his successors included and promoted Kurds, Arabs, Georgians, Circassians, and Armenians into their imperial program. Moreover, the conquests of Genghis Khan and Timur had merged Mongolian and Chagatai aspects into the Persian bureaucratic culture, terminology, seals, and symbols.

Ismail's poetry 

Ismail is also known for his poetry using the pen name Khaṭāʾī. He wrote in the Azerbaijani language, a Turkic language mutually intelligible with Turkish, and in the Persian language. He is considered an important figure in the literary history of Azerbaijani language and has left approximately 1400 verses in this language, which he chose to use for political reasons. Approximately 50 verses of his Persian poetry have also survived. According to Encyclopædia Iranica, "Ismail was a skillful poet who used prevalent themes and images in lyric and didactic-religious poetry with ease and some degree of originality". He was also deeply influenced by the Persian literary tradition of Iran, particularly by the Shahnameh of Ferdowsi, which probably explains the fact that he named all of his sons after Shahnameh-characters. Dickson and Welch suggest that Ismail's "Shāhnāmaye Shāhī" was intended as a present to his young son Tahmasp. After defeating Muhammad Shaybani's Uzbeks, Ismail asked Hatefi, a famous poet from Jam (Khorasan), to write a Shahnameh-like epic about his victories and his newly established dynasty. Although the epic was left unfinished, it was an example of mathnawis in the heroic style of the Shahnameh written later on for the Safavid kings.

Most of the poems are concerned with love—particularly of the mystical Sufi kind—though there are also poems propagating Shi'i doctrine and Safavi politics. His other serious works include the Nasihatnāme in Azerbaijani language, a book of advice, and the unfinished Dahnāme in Azerbaijani language, a book which extols the virtues of love.

Along with the poet Imadaddin Nasimi, Khatā'ī is considered to be among the first proponents of using a simpler Azerbaijani language in verse that would appeal to a broader audience. His work is most popular in Azerbaijan, as well as among the Bektashis of Turkey. There is a large body of Alevi and Bektashi poetry that has been attributed to him. The major impact of his religious writings, in the long run, was the conversion of Persia from Sunni to Shia Islam.

The following anecdote demonstrates the status of vernacular Turkish and Persian in the Ottoman Empire and in the incipient Safavid state. Khatā'ī sent a poem in Turkish to the Ottoman Sultan Selim I before going to war in 1514. In a reply the Ottoman Sultan answered in Persian to indicate his contempt.

Examples of his poems are:

Poetry example 1

Poetry example 2

Poetry example 3

Poetry from other composers about Ismail, I.

Emergence of a clerical aristocracy
An important feature of the Safavid society was the alliance that emerged between the ulama (the religious class) and the merchant community. The latter included merchants trading in the bazaars, the trade and artisan guilds (asnaf) and members of the quasi-religious organizations run by dervishes (futuvva). Because of the relative insecurity of property ownership in Persia, many private landowners secured their lands by donating them to the clergy as so-called vaqf. They would thus retain the official ownership and secure their land from being confiscated by royal commissioners or local governors, as long as a percentage of the revenues from the land went to the ulama. Increasingly, members of the religious class, particularly the mujtahids and the seyyeds, gained full ownership of these lands, and, according to contemporary historian Iskandar Munshi, Persia started to witness the emergence of a new and significant group of landowners.

Appearance and skills

Ismail was described by contemporaries as having a regal appearance, gentlemanly in quality and youthfulness. He also had a fair complexion and red hair. His appearance compared to other olive-skinned Persians, his descent from the Safavid Shaykhs, and his religious ideals, contributed to people's expectation based on various legends circulating during this period of heightened religious awareness in Western Asia.

An Italian traveller describes Ismail as follows:

Legacy 
Ismail's greatest legacy was establishing an empire which lasted over 200 years. As Alexander Mikaberidze states, "The Safavid dynasty would rule for two more centuries [after Ismail's death] and establish the basis for the modern-nation state of Iran." Even after the fall of the Safavids in 1736, their cultural and political influence endured through the era of Afsharid, Zand, Qajar, and Pahlavi dynasties into the modern Islamic Republic of Iran as well as the neighboring Azerbaijan Republic, where Shi'a Islam is still the dominant religion as it was during the Safavid era.

In popular culture

Literature 
In the Safavid period, the famous Azeri folk romance Shah Ismail emerged. According to Azerbaijani literary critic Hamid Arasly, this story is related to Ismail I. But it is also possible that it is dedicated to Ismail II.

Places and structures 
 A district (Xətai raion), facility, monument (erected in 1993, and metro station in Baku, Azerbaijan
 A street in Ganja, Azerbaijan

Statues
 A statue in Ardabil, Iran (in the Azerbaijan region of Iran)
A statue in Baku, Azerbaijan
 A sculpture in Khachmaz, Azerbaijan
A bust in Ganja, Azerbaijan

Music 
Shah Ismayil is the name of an Azerbaijani mugham opera in 6 acts and 7 scenes composed by Muslim Magomayev, in 1915–19.

Other 
Shah Ismail Order (the highest Azerbaijani military award presented by the Commander-in-chief and President of Azerbaijan)

Issue

Sons
Tahmasp I - with Tajlu Khanum. 
 'Abul Ghazi Sultan Alqas Mirza (15 March 1515 – 9 April 1550) Governor of Astrabad 1532/33–1538, Shirvan 1538–1547 and Derbent 1546–1547. He rebelled against his brother Tahmasp with Ottoman help. Captured and imprisoned at the Fortress of Qahqahan. He had a consort, Khadija Sultan Khanum, and two sons, 
 Ahmad Mirza (died 1568)  
 Farukh Mirza (died 1568)
 Rustam Mirza (born 13 September 1517)
 'Abul Naser Sultan Sam Mirza (28 August 1518 – December 1567) Governor-General of Khorasan 1521–1529 and 1532–1534, and of Ardabil 1549–1571. He rebelled against his brother Tahmasp, captured and imprisoned at the Fortress of Qahqahan. He had two sons and one daughter. His daughter married Prince Jesse of Kakheti (died 1583) Governor of Shaki, the third son of Georgian king Levan of Kakheti.
 'Abu'l Fat'h Sultan Moez od-din Bahram Mirza (7 September 1518 – 16 September 1550) - with Tajlu Khanum. Governor of Khorasan 1529–1532, Gilan 1536–1537 and Hamadan 1546–1549. He married Zainab Sultan Khanum and had three sons: 
 Sultan Husain Mirza (died 1567)  
 Ibrahim Mirza (1541–1577), 
 Badi uz-Zaman Mirza (k.1577)
 Hussein Mirza (born 11 December 1520)

Daughters
 Parikhan Khanum - with Tajlu Khanum, married in 1520–21 to  Shirvanshah Khalilullah II;
Mahinbanu Khanum - with Tajlu Khanum  (1519 – 20 January 1562, buried in Qom), unmarried;
Khanish Khanum (1507–563, buried in Imam Husayn Shrine, Karbala), married to Shah Nur-al Din Nimatullah Baqi, and had a son named Mirmiran and a daughter;
Khair al-Nisa Khanum (died at Masuleh, 13 March 1532, and buried in Sheikh Safi al-Din tomb, Ardabil), married on 5 September 1517 to Amira Dubbaj, ruler of Gilan and Fuman;
Shah Zainab Khanum;
Nakira Khanum;
Farangis Khanum;

Ancestry

See also 

 Safavid dynasty family tree
 List of Turkic-languages poets
 Safavid conversion of Iran from Sunnism to Shiism
 Seven Great Poets

References

Bibliography

 
 Yves Bomati and Houchang Nahavandi,Shah Abbas, Emperor of Persia,1587–1629, 2017, ed. Ketab Corporation, Los Angeles, English translation by Azizeh Azodi.
 
 
 
 
 
 
 
 
 
 
 
 
 
 
 M. Momen, An Introduction to Shi'i Islam, Yale Univ. Press, 1985, pp. 397, 
 M. Meserve, "The Sophy: How News of Shah Ismail Savafi Spread in Renaissance Europe." Journal of Early Modern History 18 (2014): 1–30.
 
 

1487 births
1524 deaths
16th-century Kurdish people
16th-century monarchs in the Middle East
16th-century Shia Muslims
Alevism
Azerbaijani-language poets
Critics of Sunni Islam
Iranian people of Kurdish descent
Iranian people of Greek descent
Iranian people of Turkish descent
Iranian Shia Muslims
Iranian Sufis
Kurdish Sufis
People from Ardabil
Persian-language poets
Safavid monarchs
Sufi poets
Theocrats
Twelvers
16th-century Iranian people
16th-century people of Safavid Iran